Koskowice  is a village in the administrative district of Gmina Legnickie Pole, within Legnica County, Lower Silesian Voivodeship, in south-western Poland.

The village has a population of 360.

Notable residents
 Daniel Czepko von Reigersfeld (1605–1660), German Lutheran poet and dramatist

References

Koskowice